is a museum of Ainu materials in Shinhidaka, Hokkaidō, Japan. The display has an area dedicated to Shakushain's 1669 revolt over fishing rights on the Shizunai River and swords and iron vessels excavated from local chashi. The collection also includes the skull of an Ezo wolf that has been designated a Municipal Cultural Property. Shinhidaka itself is a relatively new town, formed in 2006 from the merger of the former towns of Mitsuishi and Shizunai.

See also
 National Ainu Museum
 Shinhidaka Town Museum

References

Museums in Hokkaido
Shinhidaka, Hokkaido
1983 establishments in Japan
Museums established in 1983
Ainu
Ethnic museums